Alessandro Gori (born 4 January 1999) is an Italian football player. He plays for Vis Artena in Serie D.

Club career

Frosinone 
Born in Frosinone, Gori was a youth exponent of his hometown club Frosinone.

Loan to Paganese 
On 10 August 2018, Gori joined to Serie C club Paganese on a season-long loan. On 13 October he made his professional debut in Serie C for Paganese as a substitute replacing Danilo Gaeta in the 69th minute of a 4–0 home defeat against Catanzaro. Two weeks later, on 27 October, he played is first match as a starter for Paganese, a 2–2 away draw against Bisceglie, he was replaced by Danilo Gaeta after 76 minutes. On 16 December he was sent-off with a double yellow card in the 64th minute of a 1–0 away defeat against Virtus Francavilla. Gori ended his loan to Paganese with 12 appearances, but all in the first part of the season.

Vis Artena
On 17 August 2019, he joined Serie D club Vis Artena. Three weeks later, on 8 September, he made his Serie D debut for Vis Artena as a substitute replacing Francesco Chinappi in the 59th minute of a 2–1 away win over Trastevere. Three more weeks later, on 29 September, he played his first match as a starter for the club in a 2–1 away defeat against Latte Dolce, he was replaced after 56 minutes by Francesco Chinappi. On 3 November he played his first entire match for Vis Artena in a 1–1 home draw against Cassino.

Career statistics

Club

References

External links
 

1999 births
People from Frosinone
Footballers from Lazio
Living people
Italian footballers
Association football forwards
Frosinone Calcio players
Paganese Calcio 1926 players
Serie C players
Sportspeople from the Province of Frosinone